Biffi is a surname. Notable people with the surname include:

Carlo Biffi (1605–1675), Italian painter
G. A. Biffi (1606), an early codifier of written Italian language
Giacomo Biffi (1928–2015), Archbishop of Bologna
Jessica Biffi, a contestant on second season of Project Runway Canada TV
Roberto Biffi (born 1965), Italian football player
Serafino Biffi (1822–1899), co-founder of the Italian institution with Andrea Verga